David J. Meyer is a United States Air Force major general who serves as the assistant deputy chief of staff for operations of the United States Air Force since July 2022. He most recently served as the deputy commander of the Ninth Air Force, and was previously the deputy director of operations of the North American Aerospace Defense Command.

References 

Living people
Year of birth missing (living people)
Place of birth missing (living people)
United States Air Force generals
Major generals